Fedafjorden is a fjord  in Agder county, Norway.  The  is located in the municipalities of Kvinesdal, Flekkefjord, and Farsund.  The long, narrow fjord runs south from the mouth of the river Kvina to the Listafjorden.

The village of Feda is located at the northwestern side of the fjord, just west of the Fedafjord Bridge on the European route E39 highway. Near the mouth of the fjord, at the south end, lies the island of Andabeløya. The majority of the fjord lies in Kvinesdal municipality, but the mouth of the fjord is split between the municipalities of Flekkefjord and Farsund.

The old municipality of Feda, which existed from 1900 until 1963, encompassed the  area surrounding both sides of the Fedafjorden.

References

Fjords of Agder
Kvinesdal
Flekkefjord